Tetragonoderus pictus is a species of beetle in the family Carabidae. It was described by Perty in 1830.

References

pictus
Beetles described in 1830